Elizabeth M. Brannon is an American neuroscientist. She serves as Edmund J. and Louise W. Kahn Term Chair in the Natural Sciences at the University of Pennsylvania. Brannon's research, focused on comparative cognition, numerical cognition, and educational neuroscience, has earned an h-index of 68.

Education
Brannon earned her undergraduate degree in biological anthropology from the University of Pennsylvania. She then attended Columbia University, earning an MA in biological anthropology and a Ph.D. in psychology.

Works

 Cantlon, J.F., Platt, M.L., & Brannon, E.M. (2009). "Beyond the number domain.  Invited review." Trends in Cognitive Sciences, 13(2), 83–91.  .
 Starr, A., Libertus, M.E., & Brannon, E.M. (2013). "Infants show ratio dependent discrimination regardless of set size," Infancy, 18(6), 1–15. 
 Drucker, C., & Brannon, E. M. (2014). "Rhesus monkeys (Macaca mulatta) map number onto space," Cognition, 132(1), 57–67. .
 Park, J., & Brannon, E. M. (2014). "Improving arithmetic performance with number sense training: An investigation of underlying mechanism," Cognition, 133(1), 188–200. NIHMSID: NIHMS614955.
 Pinhas, M., Woldorff, M., & Brannon, E.M. (2014). "Electrophysiological evidence for the involvement of the approximate number system in preschoolers’ processing of spoken number words," Journal of Cognitive Neuroscience, 26(9), 1891-1904. NIHMSID: 621122
 DeWind, N.K., G.K. Adams, Platt, M.L. Brannon, E. M., (2015). "Modeling the approximate number system; Quantifying the contribution of visual stimulus features," Cognition, 142, 247–265.

References

Living people
University of Pennsylvania people
Year of birth missing (living people)
Columbia University alumni
University of Pennsylvania alumni
American neuroscientists
American women psychologists
21st-century American psychologists
21st-century American women